Methacrylic acid, abbreviated MAA, is an organic compound.  This colorless, viscous liquid is a carboxylic acid with an acrid unpleasant odor.  It is soluble in warm water and miscible with most organic solvents. Methacrylic acid is produced industrially on a large scale as a precursor to its esters, especially methyl methacrylate (MMA), and to poly(methyl methacrylate) (PMMA).

Production
In the most common route, methacrylic acid is prepared from acetone cyanohydrin, which is converted to methacrylamide sulfate using sulfuric acid. This derivative in turn is hydrolyzed to methacrylic acid, or esterified to methyl methacrylate in one step. Another route to methacrylic acid starts with isobutylene, which obtainable by dehydration of tert-butanol.  Isobutylene is oxidized sequentially to methacrolein and then methacrylic acid. Methacrolein for this purpose can also be obtained from formaldehyde and ethylene. Yet a third route involves the dehydrogenation of Isobutyric acid.

Various green routes have been explored but they have not been commercialized.  Specifically, the decarboxylation of itaconic acid, citraconic acid, and mesaconic acids affords methacrylic acid.  Salts of methacrylic acid have been obtained by boiling citra- or meso-brompyrotartaric acids with alkalis.

Pyrolysis of ethyl methacrylate efficiently gives methacrylic acid.

Uses and occurrence
Of course, the main use of MMA is its polymerization to poly(methyl methacrylate).

Methacrylic acid is used in some nail primers to help acrylic nails adhere to the nail plate.

MAA occurs naturally in small amounts in the oil of Roman chamomile.

Reactions
For a commercial applications, MMA is polymerized using azobisisobutyronitrile as a thermally activated free-radical catalyst.  Otherwise, MMA is relatively slow to polymerize thermally or photochemically.
Methacrylic acid undergoes several reactions characteristic of alpha,beta-unsaturated acids (see acrylic acid). These reactions include Diels-Alder reaction and Michael additions.  Esterifications are effected by acid-catalyzed condensations with alcohols, alkylations with certain alkenes, and transesterifications.  Epoxide ring-opening gives hydroxyalkyl esters.
Sodium amalgam reduces it to isobutyric acid. A polymeric form of methacrylic acid was described in 1880.

References

External links
  Methacrylic Acid in Europe.

Monomers
Enoic acids
Foul-smelling chemicals